The following is a detailed discography of all singles released by American singer-songwriter Willie Nelson. A total of 25 Nelson singles have reached number one on music charts in the US.

His 1982 single, "Always on My Mind", reached the top 10 of the Billboard Hot 100. Two years later, his duet with Julio Iglesias, "To All the Girls I've Loved Before", became a worldwide hit. His albums and singles were successful in many countries, especially New Zealand, Australia and some European countries.

Singles

1950s and 1960s

1970s

1980s

1990s and 2000s

2010s

2020s

Collaborations

Singles from collaboration albums

Guest singles

Other singles

Promotional singles

Other charted songs

Music videos

Notes

A^ Certified Platinum by the RIAA.
B^ "Is the Better Part Over?" did not chart on Hot Country Songs, but peaked at No. 6 on Hot Country Radio Breakouts.

Footnotes

References
 Johnson, Thomas S. "Willie Nelson: A Discographic Listing."  Monograph.  Four editions. Willie Nelson Fan Club, 1981–1985.

External links

Country music discographies
Discography
Discographies of American artists